Pieces (known in Japan as  is a 1994 puzzle game for the Super NES. It was developed by Prism Kikaku and published by Hori Electric in Japan and by Atlus Software in North America. In the game, the player has to solve jigsaw puzzles. In 2002, the spiritual successor developed by the same company, Jigsaw Madness, was released for the PlayStation .

Gameplay
The player can face either a computer or up to five human players. The computer players come at three difficulty levels (easy, normal, or hard) and feature a wide array of opponents, such as a crab made out of a rice bowl and a beautiful laughing mermaid. A few puzzles must be solved before the opponent's puzzle is solved. If the player is quick enough, items will appear. These can do anything from guiding the puzzle pieces to freezing the opponent.

Reception
GamePros Earth Angel judged the game as "an interesting variation on the standard puzzler theme." He praised the solid challenge, easy controls (particularly with the use of the Super NES Mouse), and the variety of puzzles. Mike Weigand of Electronic Gaming Monthly similarly described Pieces as "unique" with solid challenge, but singled out the two-player "Versus Mode" as the game's strongest feature. The magazine's team of five reviewers scored it an 8.2 out of 10 and later ranked it number 14 on their top 50 games from the past year. A reviewer for Next Generation commented positively on the large number of puzzles and the intensity of the two-player "Versus Mode", and gave the game three out of five stars, concluding, "Although it doesn't touch, say, Super Bomberman in the party game category, this title is still its own sort of blast."

References

External links

 Jigsaw Party at superfamicom.org
 Jigsaw Party at super-famicom.jp 
 Soundtrack information at Snesmusic.org

1994 video games
Atlus games
Puzzle video games
Super Nintendo Entertainment System games
Super Nintendo Entertainment System-only games
Video games developed in Japan

Multiplayer and single-player video games
Nippon Ichi Software games